The Usfurids were an Arab dynasty that in 1253 gained control of Eastern Arabia, including the islands of Bahrain. They were a branch of Uqaylids who re-migrated to Arabia after the fall of their rule in Syria.

Name 
The dynasty is named after its founder, ʿUṣfūr bin Rāshid. The name ʿUṣfūr means small bird.

History 
They were initially allies of the Qarmatians and their successors, the Uyunids, but eventually overthrew the latter and seized power themselves. The Usfurids' takeover came after Uyunid power had been weakened by invasion in 1235 by the Salghurid Atabeg of Fars.

The Usfurids at the beginning of their rule had a state that composed of central and eastern Arabia and even ruled parts of Oman. After 150 years of rule the Usfurids were overthrown by the Jarwanids whom in turn were overthrown by the Jabrids who were also an Uqaylid dynasty.

See also
Yusuf al-Bahrani, descendant of the Usfurid dynasty
History of Bahrain: 10th-16th centuries
 Jarwanid dynasty
 Uqaylid Dynasty
 Uyunid dynasty
Mirdasids
Kalbids

References

External links
 ديوان آل عصفور
 Jordan ديوان آل عصفور
 سايت خاندان آل عصفور در ايران

History of Saudi Arabia
Arab dynasties
Bahraini monarchs
Banu Uqayl
Arab slave owners